The Dublin-Rosslare Main Line is a main rail route between Dublin Connolly station and Rosslare Europort, where it connects with ferry services to the United Kingdom and mainland Europe. The line between Dublin and Greystones is electrified and forms the southern part of the DART service. Between Bray and Rosslare the line is single track only. The line connected with the Limerick–Rosslare line outside Rosslare Strand until 2010. From Wicklow on, semaphore signalling was used until April 2008, when the entire line was upgraded to the mini-CTC system controlled from Dublin Connolly. Although it is designated as a separate route, the line is continuous after Dublin Connolly, where it connects with the Belfast–Dublin main line.
The section between Westland Row (now Dublin Pearse) and a point on the line just after Salthill and Monkstown station is the oldest railway line in Ireland, and the first commuter railway in the world, opening in 1834. It was then known as the Dublin & Kingstown Railway. At that time, the railway terminated adjacent to the start of Dún Laoghaire Harbour's West Pier, at a station called Kingstown.

Passenger services

Monday-Friday
4 trains Dublin to Rosslare
1 train Dublin to Wexford
3 trains Rosslare to Dublin
1 train Rosslare to Dundalk
1 train Gorey to Dublin
Saturday
3 trains in each direction Dublin to Rosslare
1 train Gorey to Dundalk
Sunday
3 trains in each direction Dublin to Rosslare

Freight services
No freight services operate on this route as of 2022. Up until 2002, ammonia and fertiliser trains operated from Shelton Abbey near Arklow, where a fertilizer plant was located. However, this closed in late 2002, since when there have been no regular freight trains on this line. Bagged cement trains also operated in the past to Arklow and Gorey.

Heritage services
On a few Sundays during the summer the Railway Preservation Society of Ireland operates the "Sea Breeze", a steam hauled train with heritage carriages, between Dublin and Wexford/Rosslare.

Traction

From late July 2004, Dublin-Rosslare services have been worked exclusively by diesel railcars. Initially the railcars used were drawn from the 2700 Class fleet, but these were replaced within a year. At present, most services are worked by the 22000 Class, of which there are four carriage sets, with the 29000 Class working some services. Prior to July 2004, services were worked by sets of Mark 2D carriages hauled by 071 class locomotives.

Signalling
In April 2008, the signalling on this route was upgraded to the mini-CTC system, controlled from a signalling control centre at Greystones Station. Apart from the Limerick Junction station area on the Dublin-Cork route, which was itself upgraded to CTC in 2011, it had been the last of the routes radiating from Dublin to use Electric Train Staff (ETS) and semaphore signalling, which was still in place south of Wicklow up until April 2008.

Many of its signal cabins were situated on the corner of a footbridge. Examples include Wicklow, Rathdrum, Arklow and Gorey. At present these cabins remain in situ.

Main connections
This line connects at Dublin Connolly with the Enterprise service onwards to Belfast Lanyon Place as well as the Sligo Line, for all stations to Sligo MacDiarmada.

DART trains connect with the line at all stations between Greystones and Dublin Connolly.

There are also connections at Rosslare Europort by Stena Line to Fishguard Harbour to the West Wales Line for destinations such as Carmarthen, Swansea and Cardiff Central, where you can continue your journey to Reading and London Paddington. Irish Ferries also operate ferries to Pembroke Dock.

See also
 Dublin and South Eastern Railway
 Dublin and Kingstown Railway
 Iarnród Éireann

Notes

References

Railway lines in Ireland
Railway lines opened in 1834